Sheraphelenchus is a genus of nematodes belonging to the family Aphelenchoididae.

The species of this genus are found in Japan.

Species:

Sheraphelenchus breviguloris 
Sheraphelenchus entomophagus

References

Nematodes